Oksana Igorevna Korolyova (born 17 July 1984 in Astrakhan) is a Russian handball player. She plays for the Russian club HC Kuban Krasnodar and for the Russian National Team. She won a gold medal at the 2009 World Women's Handball Championship.

References

1984 births
Living people
Russian female handball players
Sportspeople from Astrakhan
20th-century Russian women
21st-century Russian women